Re:animation is a DJ event revolving around techno and house music dance remixes of anime and video game music held since 2010 in Tokyo.

Summary
Re:animation originated from members of an online Eureka Seven and Code Geass community on the social network Mixi who, as the community grew, began voicing their desire to have an outdoor party.

In the year 2010, the first outdoor DJ event was held in front of the now-demolished Shinjuku Koma Theater. From 2013 onwards, due to development projects on the site of the old theater, the event was moved to an open space in front of Nakano Station (Tokyo).

History

References

External links 
Official Site

Anime music
Music in Tokyo
Video game music events